ZO2 is a New York rock band with Brooklyn roots formed in 2003 when Paul Zablidowsky (“Paulie Z”) and his brother David Zablidowsky (“David Z”) (known as the “Z brothers”) approached drummer Joey Cassata to join their band. The trio is known for making throwback rock with Paulie Z on vocals and guitar, David Z on vocals and bass, and Joey Cassata on drums, percussion, and vocals.”

Background 
In the early years, the band made ends meet by playing at children’s birthday parties around New York where their clients included Robert De Niro, Michael J. Fox and Al Roker. When asked about their decision to play children’s parties, Paulie Z explained, “[i]t was really only to fund ZO2.”

Releases 

On March 27, 2004, the Brooklyn rockers released their first album, Tuesdays & Thursdays. ZO2 released its second studio album, Ain’t It Beautiful, on August 7, 2007. The band released its third album, Casino Logic, on June 9, 2009.

Live performances 
ZO2 landed its first national tour in 2004, playing 40 dates on the VH1 Rock the Nation tour as the opening act for KISS and Poison. The band has also performed with Stone Temple Pilots, Alice Cooper, Twisted Sister, Scorpions, Sammy Hagar, Dream Theater, King’s X and more.

Television 
ZO2 became the subject of a television series created by the Independent Film Channel, called “Z Rock,” which originally aired on August 24, 2008.  The series was a fictionalized, semi-scripted series based on the real lives of the members of ZO2, leading a double-life by on the one hand, playing birthday parties for the children of Manhattan’s elite by day and on the other hand, living the life of real rock stars trying to make money, get a record deal, and partying by night.

When asked why ZO2 wanted to do the series, David Z explained, “The [‘Z Rock’] storyline is absolutely based on our real lives,” . . . [e]ach episode is heavily detailed and scripted, and we fill in the blanks and ad lib the lines, like Larry David’s ‘Curb Your Enthusiasm’ — but with rock ’n’ roll enthusiasm. . . For us, the reason to do [‘Z Rock’] is it’s an amazing outlet for our music to be heard,” explained David. “Radio is amazing, and TV is bigger than radio. If you see people like Gene Simmons and Bret Michaels, everyone knows who they are, because of their shows [A&E’s ‘Family Jewels’ and VH1’s ‘Rock of Love’]. Now everybody knows them by name.”

Z Rock was picked up for a second season in June 2009, with ZO2 and its members continuing to appear.

References

Sources 

 DeSantis, Rachel. "New York band Adrenaline Mob's bassist David Zablidowsky, 38, killed in Florida car accident". nydailynews.com. 
 Press, The Associated. "Bassist for metal band Adrenaline Mob dies in Florida wreck". USA TODAY. 
 "Joey Cassata of ZO2". Modern Drummer Magazine.
 Cassata, Joey (2019-01-02). START WITH A DREAM: A Drummer's Journey from Rock & Roll to T.V. to Broadway.

External links 
 https://www.facebook.com/zo2band/
 https://www.youtube.com/user/zo2videoz

Rock music groups from New York (state)
American hard rock musical groups
American musical trios
Musical groups from Brooklyn